The Nino Konis Santana National Park  is East Timor's first national park. It links important bird areas such as Lore, Mount Paitchau, Lake Ira Lalaro, and Jaco Island. The park also includes  of the Coral Triangle, an underwater area which supposedly contains the world's greatest diversity of both coral and coral reef fish. Some of the rare birds protected by this park are the critically endangered yellow-crested cockatoo, the endemic Timor green-pigeon, the endangered Timor imperial-pigeon, and the vulnerable Timor sparrow.

The park is named in honor of the independence movement national hero Nino Konis Santana, a former commander of Falintil, who was born in Tutuala, a village within the borders of the national park.

History
Part of the park first became a natural conservation reserve during the occupation of the country by Indonesia in the period from 1975–1999. When the country was under the United Nations (UN) Control as United Nations Transitional Administration in Timor Leste (UNTEAT), the same area was declared a “protected wild area” (but combined Tutuala beach and its adjoining forest) in 2000 under Regulation Number 2000/19. The cultural heritage of the five villages and the 15,000 people with their ancient ancestral heritage was made integral to the protected area. It was designated as a Category V Landscape/Sea Scape under IUCN, which considers both nature and culture of the area as one unit for conservation and preservation, and which is akin to the criteria of Cultural Landscapes adopted for UNESCO World Heritage Sites.

Following the independence of the country in 2002, along with the scientific assessment of Important Bird Areas in the country, action to identify and declare the first National Park was also undertaken by Bird Life International in association with the Department of Environment and Climate Change (DECC), New South Wales, (Australia) and Australian Volunteers International, with financial assistance provided by Regional Natural Heritage Programme of the Australian Government, Keidanren Nature Conservation Fund (Japan), and the Darwin Initiative of the Government of the United Kingdom.

Geography

The national park also links the Important Bird Areas of Loré, Monte Paitchau, Lake Ira Lalaro and Jaco Island, identified through biological surveys undertaken by BirdLife International after the country attained independence in 2002, which cover  of the park.

There are six villages within the national park, including Com, Tutuala, Méhara and Maupitine, while Malahara is a hamlet. Former settlements include Mua Mimiraka, Lo Chami, and Lori Lata. Walled settlements are found at  Tutuala, Lori Lata, Lopomalai, Ili Mimiraka, Mua Mimiraka, and Tutun (Tutunca'u). Lautem District features Lake Iralaloro. Shell midden sites are situated at Kusu Midden and Valu Beach Midden. Oirata Latamoko, situated at Manuméri Hoiku, is considered to be an ancestral landing site for the Koawatea villagers. Of the rock shelters, Léné Ara (or Lene Hara) contains internationally exceptional heritage value; Jerimalai's occupation is dated to more than 40,000 years BP, while Matja Kuru 2 is dated to 32,000 years BP, and Matja Kuru 1 is dated to c. 14,000 BP.  The Paichao Range is situated along the south coast. Cape Hero is also known as Tanjung Tei. Jaco Island (or Totina) is seen from Ili Kérékéré cliff. The Fuiloro Plateau is also located with the NP.

Moist deciduous lowland forest and evergreen forest on the hills are the vegetation types in the park, apart from the marshy lands of Lake Ira Lalaro. Primary forests are a notable feature of the flora in the park. Dry deciduous, swamp forest and coastal strand vegetation are also the floral varieties recorded in the park.

Wildlife

Flora

Vegetation types which are part of the common usage of the people are medicinal plants, bamboo, and canoe trees. The lake's flood plains have grass vegetation which are used by the villagers of Mehara and Maupitine for grazing their livestock. Wetlands of the flood plains are also used for growing rice and tobacco, and also distilling palm liquor as part of their living needs.

Fauna

There are Timor endemic and scientifically undescribed shrews and bat species in the park. More than 20 native bat species have been recorded in the park. There are also a series of described and undescribed giant rats known from sub-fossil deposits, which may now be extinct. Several mammals were introduced from outside the island during late prehistoric and historic times when people had started inhabiting the area. Some of the common species seen in the wild are birds, bats, murids and most commonly exploited northern common cuscus (Phalanger orientalis) which is reported to have been introduced from Papua New Guinea about 9,000 years ago.

The Coral Triangle part of the park is one of the greatest diversity areas for coral and coral reef fish in the world. Marine resources which also form the livelihood of the coastal villages of Com and Tutuala are species of pelagic fish, shellfish, tutel (ipitu), meci (sea worms) during the season and sardines (api moko). Catfish and bream are harvested from Lake Ira Lalaro.

Avifauna
The terrestrial area of the park has 200 bird species, of which the endangered species are Timor green pigeon (Treron psittaceus) (the cause for the species getting recorded under the endangered list is the loss of monsoon forest due to deforestation) and the yellow-crested cockatoo (Cacatua sulphurea), a critically endangered species affected due local captures in Wallacea for regional and global trade. About 10 Timor-endemic bird species occur in the park. The globally threatened and globally restricted-range bird species listed by the Bird Life International are the following.

 Dusky cuckoo-dove Macropygia magna
 Slaty cuckoo-dove Turacoena modesta (NT, RR)
 Timor green-pigeon Treron psittaceus (EN, RR)
 Pink-headed imperial-pigeon Ducula rosacea (NT, RR)
 Yellow-crested cockatoo Cacatua sulphurea (CR)
 Olive-shouldered parrot Aprosmictus jonquillaceus (RR)
 Cinnamon-banded kingfisher Todiramphus australasia (RR)
 Streaky-breasted honeyeater Meliphaga reticulata (RR)
 Plain friarbird Philemon inornatus (RR)
 Yellow-eared honeyeater Lichmera flavicans (RR)
 Red-rumped myzomela Myzomela vulnerata (RR)
 Plain gerygone Gerygone inornata (RR)
 Fawn-breasted whistler Pachycephala orpheus (RR)
 Timor figbird Sphecotheres viridis (RR)
 Olive-brown oriole  Oriolus melanotis (RR)
 Timor stubtail Urosphena subulata (RR)
 Spot-breasted white-eye Heleia muelleri (NT, RR)
 Orange-banded thrush Zoothera peronii (NT, RR)
 White-bellied bushchat Saxicola gutturalis (NT)
 Black-banded flycatcher Ficedula timorensis (NT)
 Timor blue-flycatcher  Cyornis hyacinthinus (RR)
 Red-chested flowerpecker Dicaeum maugei (RR)
 Flame-breasted sunbird Nectarinia solaris (RR)
 Tricoloured parrotfinch Erythrura tricolor (RR)

Legend: CR - critically endangered; EN - endangered; NT - near threatened; RR - restricted-range (global range less than 50,000 km2)

Cultural value

Over 200 cultural sites have been identified within the national park. The settlements in the park are inhabited by Fataluku people who speak a linguistically-distinct language and consider themselves to be ethnically distinct from those who do not speak their language. The Fataluku have many ritualistic sites (lupurasa) within the park. Nino Konis Santana National Park contains many rock art sites, with paintings on walls of limestone terraces and also in caves, as well as a rock engraving site. Printed sacred cloth with some of the rock art forms is exchanged during marriage ceremonies. These art forms are also seen carved on ratu houses and on Catholic headstones. Many rock shelters and caves with ancestral figures of heritage value have also been recorded in the park, apart from ancient walled and open settlements, shell middens, artifacts of pottery made of stone and shells, burial sites, and water sources.

See also
 List of Important Bird Areas in East Timor

References

Bibliography

Further reading
 

National parks of East Timor
Protected areas established in 2007
Lautém Municipality
Important Bird Areas of East Timor